José Bustamante Nava (born 5 March 1921 or 1922, date of death unknown) was a Bolivian football defender.

Career
Bustamante played for Bolivia in the 1950 FIFA World Cup. He earned a total of 29 caps, scoring no goals between 1946 and 1953. He also played for Club Litoral.

Bustamante is deceased.

References

External links

FIFA profile

1920s births
Year of death missing
1949 South American Championship players
1950 FIFA World Cup players
Association football defenders
Bolivian footballers
Bolivia international footballers
Club Deportivo Litoral (Cochabamba) players